Thelymitra × dentata, commonly called hybrid sun orchid, is a species of orchid in the family Orchidaceae that is endemic to New Zealand. It has a single fleshy, channelled leaf and up to six blue or pink flowers with prominent dark blue stripes. It is a natural hybrid between T. longifolia and T. pulchella and is only found where the parent species occur together.

Description
The sepals and petals are egg-shaped with the slightly narrower end towards the base. The side lobes have clusters of pale yellow hairs. Flowering occurs from November to January but the flowers are sterile and do not produce capsules.

Taxonomy and naming
Thelymitra × dentata was first formally described in 1968 by Lucy Moore from a specimen she collected near Kaitoke and the description was published in Royal Society Te Apārangi. The specific epithet (x dentata) is a Latin word meaning "toothed" or "pointed", referring to the toothed edges of the column arms.

Distribution and habitat
The hybrid sun orchid grows in shrubland, gumland and peat bogs, but only in the presence of its parent species. It is found on the North Island between Wellington and Waikato and on parts of the west coast of the South Island.

References

dentata
Endemic orchids of New Zealand
Orchids of New Zealand
Plants described in 1968
Interspecific orchid hybrids